The 2006–07 Lega Basket Serie A season, known as the Serie A TIM for sponsorship reasons, was the 88th season of the Lega Basket Serie A, the highest professional basketball league in Italy.

The regular season ran from 11 October 2009 to May 2010. The top 8 teams made the play-offs whilst the lowest ranked teams, B.C. Ferrara and the bankrupt club NSB Napoli, were relegated to the Legadue.

Montepaschi Siena won their 5th title by winning the playoff finals series against Armani Jeans Milano.

Rules

Format 
The participating 16 teams disputed the regular season based on home-and-away matches. At the end of regular season, the highest ranked 8 teams were admitted into play-off, with the lowest two ranked teams being relegated to LegADue

Squad rules 
Every team was allowed to present in its roster up to 6 athletes that haven't been "formed" in Italy (of which at least 3 have to be citizens of European Union), out of total 12 players in squad.

Participating teams 

The newcomers, compared to 2008–09 Serie A, were Cimberio Varese, returning to Serie A after one season in LegADue, and Vanoli Cremona, created by unification of Vanoli Soresina (promoted to Serie A through playoff) with Juvi Basket Cremona (that ceded the title of Serie A Dilettanti to Basket Brescia Leonessa). Another change was reallocation of NSB Napoli to PalaBarbuto in Napoli. On 13 April NSB Napoli was excluded from the league. Results of matches already played against the team were discarded.

Regular season

Classification

Calendar and results

Play-offs

Quarterfinals 
Quarterfinals are played in a 2–2–1 format: i.e. the first 2 matches are played at the higher seed's home stadium, the following two at the other team's home, and the fifth match, if necessary, is played again at the higher seed's home stadium.

Siena – Treviso

Cantù – Virtus Bologna

Milano – Montegranaro

Caserta – Roma

Semifinals 
Semifinals were disputed in 2–2–1 format: the first 2 matches are played at the better placed team home stadium, the following two at the other team home, and the fifth match, if required, was played again at the better-placed team.

Siena – Cantú

Caserta – Milano

Finals 
The final was disputed in 2–2–1–1–1 format: the first 2 matches were played at the better placed team home stadium, the following two at the other team home, the fifth match, if required, was played again at the better-placed team. The sisth match played again at the lower-placed team and if necessary a seventh game at the better-placed team.

Siena – Milano

Coppa Italia 
The top eight teams at the halfway point of the regular season (15 rounds) competed in the Italian Cup, seeded according to their league placement at that time. The cup was won by top seed Montepaschi Siena, for second year in a row (and second time ever).

Supercoppa Italiana 
The Italian Supercup was played as a single match before the start of the season between the previous year's Serie A champion and Coppa Italia winner (if a club wins both, the match instead pits the top two teams from the previous season's league). This season, the game, played 30 September in Siena, pitted three-time defending league champion Montepaschi Siena against Coppa Italia runner-up Virtus Bologna.

 Montepaschi Siena – Virtus Bologna 87–65

Trofees 
 Champion of Italy: 
 Italian Cup winner: Montepaschi Siena 
 Supercup winner: Montepaschi Siena
 Relegated to LegADue:  Carife Ferrara
 Relegated to LegADue:  NSB Napoli

Notes

External links 
 LegaBasket.it 

Lega Basket Serie A seasons
1
Italy